This is a list of drama films of the 1930s.

1930
 Blue Angel
 Earth
 Morocco
 Under the Roofs of Paris

1931
 The Champ
 La Chienne
 Kameradschaft
 Mädchen in Uniform

1932
 Freaks
 Grand Hotel
 I Am a Fugitive from a Chain Gang
 The Mouthpiece
 Rain
 Shanghai Express
 Vanity Fair

1933
 Apart from You
 Counsellor at Law
 Ecstasy
 The Power and the Glory
 Taki No Shiraito
 Wild Boys of the Road
 Zéro de conduite

1934
 L'Atalante
 The Barretts of Wimpole Street
 Man's Way with Women
 Manhattan Melodrama
 Les Misérables
 Of Human Bondage
 Toni

1935
 Born to Gamble
 David Copperfield
 Million Dollar Haul
 A Tale of Two Cities

1936
 La belle équipe
 Camille
 Come and Get It 
 Dodsworth
 Fury
 Osaka Elegy
 The Petrified Forest
 Reefer Madness
 Romeo and Juliet
 San Francisco
 Sisters of the Gion

1937
 Dead End
 The Good Earth
 Grand Illusion
 The Life of Emile Zola
 Pépé le Moko
 A Star is Born
 Stella Dallas
 Topper

1938
 Angels with Dirty Faces
 La Bête Humaine
 Boys Town
 A Christmas Carol
 The Citadel
 In Old Chicago 
 J'accuse
 Jezebel
 The Song of the Scarlet Flower

1939
 Dark Victory
 Gone with the Wind
 Goodbye, Mr. Chips
 Hunchback of Notre Dame
 Jamaica Inn
 Of Mice and Men
 The Rules of the Game
 The Stars Look Down
 Wuthering Heights
 The Zero Hour

References

Drama
1930s